Mullagh may refer to:

Places in Ireland
Mullagh, County Cavan
Mullagh, County Clare
Mullagh, County Down, a townland in the civil parish of Killyleagh, County Down, Northern Ireland
Mullagh, County Galway
Mullagh, County Londonderry, a townland in County Londonderry, Northern Ireland
Mullagh, County Meath, see List of townlands of County Meath
Mullagh, County Tyrone, a townland in the civil parish of Ardstraw, County Tyrone, Northern Ireland

Other uses
Johnny Mullagh (1841-1891), Australian cricketer
Mullagh GAA, a Gaelic Athletic Association club based in the parish of Mullagh, County Galway, Ireland